Boris Alekseyevich Batanov (July 15, 1934 in Moscow – June 18, 2004 in Moscow) was a Soviet football player.

The father of figure skater Elena Batanova, father in law of hockey player Igor Larionov.

Honours
 Soviet Top League winner: 1960, 1965.
 Soviet Cup winner: 1960.

International career
Batanov played his only game for USSR on June 18, 1961 in a 1962 FIFA World Cup qualifier against Turkey (1:0).

External links
  Profile

1934 births
2004 deaths
Russian footballers
Soviet footballers
Soviet Union international footballers
Soviet Top League players
FC Zenit Saint Petersburg players
FC Torpedo Moscow players
Footballers from Moscow
Russian football managers
FC Rubin Kazan managers
FC Luch Vladivostok managers
Association football midfielders
FC Volga Nizhny Novgorod players